Christian Henson (born 25 December 1971) is a British composer, primarily working on television and film soundtracks. He has also soundtracked video games, and is the co-founder of Spitfire Audio with fellow composer Paul Thomson. Henson has been nominated for a BAFTA and an Ivor Novello Award for his music.

Early life
Henson is the older son of actors Una Stubbs and Nicky Henson. His younger brother Joe Henson is also a composer, as is his half-brother Keaton Henson. His uncle was the farmer and television presenter Joe Henson and Adam Henson is his cousin. His great-uncle was the cricketer Geoffrey Howard. His great-great-grandfather was Sir Ebenezer Howard, founder of the garden city movement and the first garden cities Letchworth and Welwyn Garden City. His paternal grandfather was the English actor and comedian Leslie Henson, who was perhaps best known for founding the Entertainments National Service Association (ENSA) during the Second World War.

As a child, Henson acted in the 1980 film Never Never Land. After attending Holland Park Comprehensive in the 1980s, in his youth Henson worked for three years as a baker, with a home studio that he used in his spare time. He suffered a brain haemorrhage at 25, gave up his bakery job and moved into music and voiceover producing and engineering full time, as well as making music for porn videos.

Composing
In the early 1990s, Henson worked on drum and bass and breakbeat music with acts such as LTJ Bukem and the Freestylers.

From 1997-2001, he worked as an assistant for composers Anne Dudley, Harry Gregson-Williams, Rupert Gregson-Williams and Patrick Doyle. Henson cannot read music, and taught himself how to orchestrate soundtracks.

Awards and nominations
Henson gained a 2007 Ivor Novello Awards nomination for 'Best Original Movie Score' for his work on the 2006 film Severance. He received 2004 World Soundtrack Awards "Soundtrack Composer of the Year" and "Discovery of the Year" nominations for Les fils du vent.

Henson was nominated, along with fellow composers Jerry Goldsmith and The Flight (his brother Joe Henson and Alexis Smith), for a BAFTA for the music of the Alien: Isolation video game in 2015.

Spitfire Audio
Henson founded the British music technology company Spitfire Audio with fellow composer Paul Thomson in 2007. The company is a producer of musical "virtual instruments", and has collaborated with noted film composer Hans Zimmer, as well as Chad Smith  of the Red Hot Chili Peppers, Olafur Arnalds, Roger Taylor of Queen, Eric Whitacre, and most recently with the BBC Symphony Orchestra.
In 2018, Henson launched a website called Pianobook, dedicated to creating and sharing sampled instruments for free. It is run by a small group of volunteers, but anyone could share and use sounds, for free.

On February 24th, 2023, despite Henson announcing that he would be stepping away from Spitfire Audio following backlash to a tweet supporting Graham Linehan and J. K. Rowling which was posted on his personal Twitter account (which he temporarily deactivated afterward)  Henson remains a director of Spitfire Music Limited, Spitfire Audio UK Limited, and Spitfire Audio Holdings Limited

Personal life
Henson is married to Scottish singer and songwriter Dot Allison. They live in Edinburgh, Scotland.

Selected works

Films

2002 Cybermutt
2002 Biggie & Tupac
2004 Chasing Liberty
2004 Les fils du vent
2005 Animal
2006 Severance
2006 Opal Dream
2006 It's a Boy Girl Thing
2007 Scorpion
2008 Miss Conception
2008 Summer Heat
2008 The Secret of Moonacre
2008 A Bunch of Amateurs
2009 Pandemic
2009 Triangle
2009 Malice in Wonderland
2010 Black Death
2010 The Round Up
2010 Huge
2011 Chalet Girl
2011 The Devil's Double
2011 Wild Bill
2011 Up There
2011 Hysteria
2012 Grabbers
2012 Storage 24
2013 Trap for Cinderella
2013 Believe
2013 Soulmate
2014 Terroir
2014 Robot Overlords
2015 The Go-Between
2016 Tommy's Honour
2022 This Is Christmas
2023 Unwelcome

Television

2001-2009 Two Pints of Lager and a Packet of Crisps
2002-2004 Top Gear. Dickey Betts (arr. by Christian Henson)
2002 SAS: Are You Tough Enough?
2002 Scream Team
2002 Full Metal Challenge
2003 Wreck Detectives
2005 Diameter of the Bomb
2008 Lost in Austen
2009-2013 Poirot
2009 Richard Hammond's Blast Lab
2011-2016 Fresh Meat
2011 Kidnap and Ransom
2012 Sinbad
2014–Present Inside No. 9
2016 Wolfblood
2016 Tutankhamun
2018 Trauma
2018 Urban Myths
2019 Home

Video games
2008 Zubo
2013 Assassin's Creed IV: Black Flag
2014 Alien: Isolation

References

External links
 
 Henson on Twitter
 Video of Henson overseeing a real-time recording session in Air Studios for the Tutankhamun soundtrack
 Gramophone article about the video
 2017 interview with Henson
 2018 interview with Henson

1971 births
English television composers
English male composers
Living people
English film score composers
English male film score composers
People educated at Holland Park School